WXEL-TV (channel 42), is a PBS member television station serving West Palm Beach, Florida, United States that is licensed to Boynton Beach. Owned by South Florida PBS, it is a sister station to Miami-licensed flagship and fellow PBS member WPBT (channel 2) and Miami-licensed Class A station WURH-CD (channel 13). The three stations share transmitter facilities on Northwest 199th Street in Andover; WXEL's studios are located on South Congress Avenue in Boynton Beach.

On cable, the station can be seen on Comcast Xfinity channel 6 (in Martin, Palm Beach, Okeechobee, and southern St. Lucie counties), channel 2 (in Indian River and northern St. Lucie counties), channel 20 (in select areas of Miami-Dade and Broward counties) and in high definition on digital channel 440.

History

WXEL signed on-the-air on July 8, 1982 as WHRS-TV, under the ownership of South Florida Public Telecommunications. It was a sister station to WHRS-FM, founded in 1969. The call letters came from Hagen Road Elementary School, where the radio station's studios were originally based. Prior to 1982, Miami's WPBT had doubled as the PBS member for the Palm Beaches and Treasure Coast, and continued to claim the Palm Beaches as part of its primary coverage area for several years. In January 1985, the station became known as WXEL-TV along with its sister radio station, WXEL-FM (now WFLV). (The WXEL call sign had been used on channel 8 in Cleveland, Ohio, on what is now Fox affiliate WJW.)

In 1997, South Florida Public Telecommunications sold WXEL-FM-TV to Barry University, a Catholic university located in Miami Shores. During its ownership, WXEL was one of at least three PBS members owned and operated by a Catholic-related organization (WLAE-TV in New Orleans, Louisiana and KMBH in Harlingen, Texas were the others), and one of at least four run by a religious organization in general (counting Provo, Utah's KBYU-TV). Despite the Catholic-based ownership, WXEL showed no religious programming, other than religious documentaries provided by PBS.

Over the intervening years the stations grew under Barry University's stewardship and the station's then CEO, Jerry Carr. In 2004, the station began digital broadcasting as part of the nation’s conversion to DTV and later, in 2009, turned off its analog signal and went completely digital. During this period, the University decided to exit broadcasting part of a change in strategic direction. It entered into a purchase agreement with the Educational Broadcasting Corporation (owners of New York City's WNET and WLIW) and the Community Broadcast Foundation of Palm Beach and the Treasure Coast. This agreement was terminated in 2008 with the University subsequently selling WXEL-FM separately to the American Public Media Group in 2011. Carr retired in 2010.

While a number of organizations approached Barry University as candidates to purchase the television station, the University announced on February 27, 2012 that the station would be acquired by a community-based group led by the station’s current CEO, Bernie Henneberg. Henneberg’s group, the WXEL Public Broadcasting Corporation, sought and was granted approval by the Florida Department of Education to operate the station and continue to receive state support. In July 2012, after completing an extensive review of its application, the Federal Communications Commission (FCC) formally transferred the license for WXEL-TV to the Corporation. The sale was finalized on July 21, 2012. On February 7, 2013, the FCC issued a license renewal authorization for a term expiring on February 1, 2021.

On July 15, 2015, Community Television Foundation of South Florida, Inc. (owner of WPBT) announced an agreement with the WXEL Public Broadcasting Corporation to merge the operations of both WPBT and WXEL-TV into a new entity, to be known as "South Florida PBS". The merger, which was formally filed with the FCC on July 16, would enable the two stations to pool resources and fundraising efforts to offer more program content.

Digital television

Digital channel

Analog-to-digital conversion
WXEL-TV discontinued regular programming on its analog signal, over UHF channel 42, on June 12, 2009, the official date in which full-power television stations in the United States transitioned from analog to digital broadcasts under federal mandate. The station's digital signal remained on its pre-transition UHF channel 27. Through the use of PSIP, digital television receivers display the station's virtual channel as 42. WHDT subsequently moved its digital signal to UHF channel 42, moving from channel 59 which was removed from broadcast use as part of the transition.

Repeaters
In addition to its main signals, WXEL is also carried on the following repeater:

WXEL's use of a repeater is necessary as WXEL's main signal does not reach all of its viewers along the Treasure Coast.

W31DC-D broadcasts on UHF channel 31. However, through the use of PSIP, digital television receivers will display W31DC-D's virtual channel as 44, its previous analog channel as W44AY.

References

External links
WXEL website

XEL-TV
PBS member stations
Television channels and stations established in 1982
Boynton Beach, Florida
Barry University
1982 establishments in Florida